Tito Jackson (born April 11, 1975) is an American politician who was a member of the Boston City Council. He represented council District 7, which consists of the Roxbury neighborhood and parts of Dorchester, South End, and Fenway. In 2017, he ran unsuccessfully for Mayor of Boston.

Early life, family, and education
Jackson was born to a young teenager who had been sexually assaulted. He was adopted by Rosa and Herb Jackson after months in foster care, and grew up in Roxbury’s Grove Hall neighborhood. His father was a  community activist and his mother ran a home day care. Jackson attended Brookline High School and later graduated from the University of New Hampshire with a Bachelor of Arts degree in history.

In 2018, he reunited with his biological mother. His biological mother is one of the subjects of the Pulitzer Prize-winning book Common Ground by J. Anthony Lukas, which focused on desegregation busing in Boston.

Early political career
In 2007, Jackson served as the industry director for information technology in Governor Deval Patrick’s Executive Office of Housing and Economic Development. Later, Jackson worked as the political director of Governor Patrick's successful 2010 reelection campaign.

Boston City Council

In the Boston City Council election of 2009, Jackson ran as an at-large candidate. He lost in this first attempt at running for elected office by 11,676 votes.

Jackson ran in the 2011 special election for the 7th district Boston City Council seat to succeed Chuck Turner, who had been expelled from the City Council after a public corruption investigation by the Federal Bureau of Investigation. Jackson finished first out of seven candidates in the nonpartisan primary election and defeated Cornell Mills, the son of former State Senator Dianne Wilkerson, 82 percent to 16 percent in the general election.

Councillor Jackson was the Chair of the Committee on Education, and the Chair of the Special Committee on the Status of Black and Latino Men and Boys. Councillor Jackson also served as the Vice Chair of the Committee on Healthy Women, Families and Communities. In addition, he was a member of six other Committees: City, Neighborhood Services and Veteran Affairs; Homelessness, Mental Health and Recovery; Housing and Community Development, Jobs, Wages and Workforce Development; Public Safety and Criminal Justice; and together with all other Councillors, the Committee of the Whole.

In 2014, the City Council passed an ordinance by Jackson to create a commission on Black men and boys. Mayor Marty Walsh vetoed the ordinance, arguing that such a commission would, "duplicate and complicate efforts that my administration is already engaged in", and that the ordinance was written in such a way that he believed it would violate the city charter. Such a commission would eventually be formed in 2021, with the City Council passing a resolution to form a similar commission, which then-acting mayor Kim Janey signed into law in September 2021.

In 2015, Jackson applied pressure to the committee behind Boston's bid for the 2024 Summer Olympics for them to release the non-redacted copy of its original bid for the games.

Jackson was a prominent opponent of 2016 Massachusetts Question 2.

2017 mayoral campaign 

In January 2017 Jackson announced he would run for Mayor of Boston in the 2017 mayoral election against the incumbent, Marty Walsh. In launching his candidacy, Jackson positioned himself as the "progressive" candidate in the race, and cited issues such as income inequality and housing as central to his candidacy.

In the nonpartisan primary election held on September 26, 2017, Jackson received 29 percent of the votes to Walsh's 63 percent. Jackson moved onto the general election on November 7, 2017. Only 14 percent of the city's voting population cast votes compared to the  last preliminary mayoral contest in 2013 with 31 percent.

Jackson focused much of his efforts on aiming to win the city's Black vote.

Jackson lost the general election race with 34 percent of the votes to Walsh's 65 percent.

Post-City Council career

After leaving the Boston City Council, Jackson worked as the chief executive of Verdant Medical, a Massachusetts medical & recreational marijuana company. He now, as of 2022, works as the chief executive officer of the Apex Noire marijuana company.

Jackson tested positive for coronavirus in March 2020.

In the 2021 Boston mayoral election, Jackson endorsed the unsuccessful primary election campaign of Kim Janey. After Janey was eliminated in the primary, he endorsed the successful general election campaign of Michelle Wu.

On March 16, 2022, Jackson was one of fourteen names put forth by the Boston City Council as nominees serve on the newly-established Boston Commission on Black Men and Boys. Mayor Wu had the authority to select seven of these nominees to appoint to the commission. The commission has 21 members, seven of which are selected by the mayor after being first recommended from the Boston City Council, while the remainder are selected by the mayor independently from a pool of applicants. On May 19, 2022, Mayor Wu announced that she would appoint Jackson to the commission.

In October 2022, Jackson spoke before the Boston City Council in support of a proposal by the City Council to raise the pay of city councilors by 20%. He claimed in his remarks that after his election to the city council, he nearly lost his house to foreclosure. While the amendment was passed by the council, Mayor Wu vetoed it. Wu supported an 11% increase, which had been the recommendation of Boston’s compensation advisory board, but opposed a 20% increase.

Electoral history

City Council

 write-in votes

 write-in votes

Mayor

References

Further reading

External links
 City Councilor Tito Jackson Swearing In at cityofboston.gov (March 26, 2011)

Boston City Council members
Massachusetts Democrats
People from Roxbury, Boston
Living people
Brookline High School alumni
University of New Hampshire alumni
Year of birth missing (living people)
African-American city council members in Massachusetts
21st-century African-American people
20th-century African-American people
1975 births